A disintegrin and metalloproteinase with thrombospondin motifs 3 is an enzyme that in humans is encoded by the ADAMTS3 gene. The protein encoded by this gene is the major procollagen II N-propeptidase.

Structure 

This gene encodes a member of the ADAMTS (a disintegrin and metalloproteinase with thrombospondin motifs) protein family. Members of the family share several distinct protein modules, including a propeptide region, a metalloproteinase domain, a disintegrin-like domain, and a thrombospondin type 1 (TS) motif. Individual members of this family differ in the number of C-terminal TS motifs, and some have unique C-terminal domains. The protein encoded by this gene is the major procollagen II N-propeptidase.

Function 

Because of the high similarity to ADAMTS2, the major substrate of ADAMTS3 had been erroneously assumed to be procollagen II. However, ADAMTS3 appears largely irrelevant for collagen maturation but instead is required for the activation of the lymphangiogenic growth factor VEGF-C. Hence, ADAMTS3 is essential for the development and growth of lymphatic vessels. The proteolytic processing of VEGF-C by ADAMTS3 is regulated by the CCBE1 protein.

ADAMTS3 has been shown to cleave reelin, a protein that regulates the proper lamination of the brain cortex and whose signal activity is found to be disrupted in a number of neuropsychiatric conditions.

Clinical significance 

A deficiency of this protein may be responsible for dermatosparaxis, a genetic defect of connective tissues.

Some hereditary forms of lymphedema are caused by mutations in ADAMTS3.

References

Further reading

External links 
 The MEROPS online database for peptidases and their inhibitors: M12.220
 

ADAMTS